Bardeh Rash may refer to various places in Iran:
 Bardeh Rash, Baneh, Kurdistan
 Bardeh Rash, Bowalhasan, Baneh County, Kurdistan Province
 Bardeh Rash, Nameh Shir, Baneh County, Kurdistan Province
 Bardeh Rash, Divandarreh, Kurdistan
 Bardeh Rash, Saral, Divandarreh County, Kurdistan
 Bardeh Rash, Marivan, Kurdistan
 Bardeh Rash, West Azerbaijan
 Bardeh Rash-e Olya, Kermanshah Province